Lepidotheca is a genus of cnidarians belonging to the family Stylasteridae.

The species of this genus are found in Southern Hemisphere.

Species:
 Lepidotheca altispina Cairns, 1991 
 Lepidotheca brochi Cairns, 1986

References

Stylasteridae
Hydrozoan genera